Inner Passion is the 2016 duet album by pianist Peter Kater and cellist Tina Guo.  The album was fully improvised upon the musician’s first musical meeting.  It debuted at number four on the Billboard New Age Albums chart. Inner Passion received a Grammy Award nomination for Best New Age Album at the 59th Annual Grammy Awards.

Track listing

References

2016 albums
Instrumental duet albums
Tina Guo albums
New-age albums
Musical improvisation
Hearts of Space Records albums